The All-Ireland Junior Club Camogie Championship is a camogie competition between clubs at the junior level. The winners are awarded the Phil McBride Cup.

Roll of honour

See also
 All-Ireland Senior Club Camogie Championship#All-Ireland Junior Club Camogie Finals

References

External links
 Official Camogie Association Website
 Championship history

Camogie competitions